Greg Marsden (November 8, 1950) was the NCAA women's gymnastics coach at the University of Utah. He led the Utah Red Rocks to 10 national titles and was named National Coach of the Year 7 times. He also served as the U.S.A. National Women's Team coach in 1987.

Biography
Marsden was born on November 8, 1950 in Hanford, California. He received his bachelor's degree in Physical Education from Central Arkansas in 1972 and his Masters from Arkansas State in 1973.

Coaching career

Marsden's record is 1048-208-8. He has coached his team to 10 Championships overall (9 NCAA Championships) and 18 Top-2 national finishes, and is a 7-time National Coach of the Year. He served as U.S.A. National Women's Team coach in 1987.

Retirement
On April 20, 2015, Marsden announced his retirement from the Utah Red Rocks team after 40 years as head coach. His wife, Megan, and assistant coach, Tom Farden, succeeded him.

Personal life
Marsden is married to one of his former athletes, Megan Marsden, formerly Megan McCunniff, a three-time NCAA all-champion, and as of July 2009 the co-head coach of the Red Rocks. She has been an assistant coach since 1985.
Together they have two sons, Montana and Dakota.

References

External links
Marsden Bio
Utah Gymnastics Homepage

Living people
1950 births
American gymnastics coaches
Utah Red Rocks coaches